Daylon Anthony McCutcheon (born December 9, 1976) is a former American football cornerback who played his entire career with the Cleveland Browns.

High school career
McCutcheon played high school football at Bishop Amat Memorial High School in La Puente, California under the direction of then-head coach Mark Paredes.  As a senior, he rushed for 2,456 yards in 1994; however he chose to play cornerback in college because his pro prospects were considered better at that position.

College career
McCutcheon played college football at the University of Southern California. Although he played primarily on defense, the Trojans occasionally used him as a receiver due to his overall talent. Following his senior year, he was named All-America second-team by The Sporting News and All-Pac-10 first-team.  He was also a semifinalist for the Jim Thorpe Award.

Professional career

McCutcheon played in 103 games with 96 starts and accumulated 463 tackles, 7 sacks, 12 interceptions, 63 pass breakups, and 8 forced fumbles  for the Browns before being released on March 9, 2007.

Coaching career
Beginning in 2007,  McCutcheon began coaching at his former high school.

New York Jets
McCutcheon was named the New York Jets' assistant defensive backs coach on January 29, 2015. On January 16, 2018, it was announced that McCutcheon would not be retained as the assistant defensive backs coach for the 2018 season.

Personal life 
McCutcheon‘s father, Lawrence McCutcheon, was an all-pro running back who set the since-broken Los Angeles Rams career rushing record (6,186 yards) and played in Super Bowl XIV. His son, Dyson McCutcheon, is a Washington commit.

References

1976 births
Living people
American football cornerbacks
USC Trojans football players
Cleveland Browns players
New York Jets coaches